Metynnis lippincottianus, commonly known as the spotted silver dollar, is a species of serrasalmid native to the Brazilian Amazon and multiple rivers of French Guiana. An average M. lippincottianus can grow to a length of 13 cm.

The fish is named in honor of Cope’s friend, James S. Lippincott (1819-1885), who made contributions to Meteorology, Agriculture and other studies.

References

Taxa named by Edward Drinker Cope
Fish described in 1870
Serrasalmidae